Crassispira safagaensis is a species of sea snail, a marine gastropod mollusc in the family Pseudomelatomidae.

Description
The length of the shell attains 16 mm.

Distribution
This marine species occurs in the Red Sea.

References

External links
 

safagaensis
Gastropods described in 2008